The 2014–15 winter transfer window for English football transfers opened on 3 January and closes on 2 February. Additionally, players without a club may join at any time, clubs below Premier League level may sign players on loan at any time, and clubs may sign a goalkeeper on an emergency loan if they have no registered goalkeeper available. This list includes transfers featuring at least one Premier League or Football League Championship club which were completed after the end of the summer 2014 transfer window and before the end of the 2014–15 winter window.

Transfers

All players, and clubs without a flag are English. Note that while Cardiff City and Swansea City are affiliated with the Football Association of Wales and thus take the Welsh flag, they play in the English football league system, and so their transfers are included here.

References

Specific

Transfers Winter 2014-15
Winter 2014-15
English